Montes Claros Vôlei is a Brazilian men's volleyball team from Montes Claros, Minas Gerais. The team has been created in Goiás in 1998 under the name Associação de Paula e Montecristo Voleibol. It was transferred to Montes Claros to dispute the Brazilian Superleague for the season 2013–14, and was rebranded to Montes Claros Vôlei.

In the 2019/20 season, Montes Claros will represent América Futebol Clube.

Current squad 
Squad as of October 31, 2016

Head coach:  Marcelinho Ramos
Assistant coach:  Leandro Dutra

References

Brazilian volleyball clubs
Volleyball clubs in Minas Gerais (state)